Maltignano is a comune (municipality) in the Province of Ascoli Piceno in the Italian region Marche, located about  south of Ancona and about  east of Ascoli Piceno.

Maltignano borders the following municipalities: Ascoli Piceno, Folignano, Sant'Egidio alla Vibrata.

Demographic evolution

References

Cities and towns in the Marche